The Dreispitz is a mountain of the Bernese Alps, overlooking Kiental in the Bernese Oberland. The summit can be reached by a trail from the Renggpass.

References

External links

 Dreispitz on Hikr

Mountains of the Alps
Mountains of Switzerland
Mountains of the canton of Bern
Two-thousanders of Switzerland